Mangelia perminima is a species of sea snail, a marine gastropod mollusk in the family Mangeliidae.

Description
The length of the shell attains 2.6 mm.

Distribution
This marine species occurs off Port Alfred, South Africa.

References

 Turton, William Harry. The marine shells of Port Alfred, S. Africa. H. Milford, Oxford University Press, 1932.

External links
  Tucker, J.K. 2004 Catalog of recent and fossil turrids (Mollusca: Gastropoda). Zootaxa 682:1–1295.
 
 Conchology: Mangelia perminima

Endemic fauna of South Africa
perminima
Gastropods described in 1932